Disterna canosa is a species of beetle in the family Cerambycidae. It was described by Wilhelm Ferdinand Erichson in 1842. It is known from Australia including Tasmania.

References

Zygocerini
Beetles described in 1842